Andrew William Mathieson (born 10 October 1989) is a New Zealand former international and first-class cricketer.

He made his One Day International (ODI) debut against England on 20 June 2015. With his first delivery, he removed Jason Roy for his first ODI wicket, and finished with figures of 1 for 40 in 4 overs for the match.

References

External links
 

1989 births
Living people
New Zealand cricketers
New Zealand One Day International cricketers
Cricketers from Hamilton, New Zealand
Central Districts cricketers
Northern Districts cricketers